Gagandeep Singh (born 26 June 1987) is an Indian cricketer. He plays for Baroda. Gagandeep's fine performance in the Elite Group B match of the Ranji Trophy at the Motibaug ground helped Baroda secure a 241 run win against Gujarat.

References

External links

Indian cricketers
Baroda cricketers
1987 births
Living people
People from Gujarat